Bir Aşk Hikâyesi (English title: A Love Story) is a Turkish television drama series produced by MF Yapım. It was an adaptation of the popular South Korean television series I'm Sorry, I Love You. The series was broadcast on FOX, starring Seçkin Özdemir, Damla Sönmez, Yamaç Telli, Elçin Sangu, and Zuhal Olcay. It was developed by Özer Erten.

Cast
 Seçkin Özdemir as Korkut Ali
 Damla Sönmez as Ceylan
 Yamaç Telli as Tolga
 Elçin Sangu as Eda
 Zuhal Olcay as Gönül
 Asena Keskinci as Ece
 Güneş Sayın as Emine
 Ayşen Sezerel as Aysel
 Ayberk Pekcan as Tahsin
 Haldun Resuloğlu as Hakkı Baba
 Onay Kaya as Selim
 Fatih Dönmez as Yılmaz

International broadcast

References

External links
 

2013 Turkish television series debuts
2014 Turkish television series endings
Turkish television series based on South Korean television series
Melodrama television series
2010s romance television series